Hans Larsson (18 February 1862 in Östra Klagstorp, Malmöhus län – 16 February 1944, Lund) was a Swedish Professor of Philosophy at Lund University, Sweden and a Member of the Swedish Academy (1925-1944), chair no. 15. He was known in Sweden as Kloke-Hans ("Clever Hans").

Prof. Larsson was a humanist and an author. He was also a mentor for several Swedish authors and a prominent essayist.

Biography 

Prof. Larsson was the son of the farmer Lars Persson and Kersti Nilsdotter, and cousin of author Ola Hansson. After studentexamen in 1881 he began his studies at Lund University. He received his Bachelor of Arts in 1888. In 1893 he received the titles Licentiate of Philosophy, Doctor of Philosophy and Docent in Theoretical Philosophy with a doctoral dissertation entitled Kants transcendentala deduktion af kategorierna ("The transcendental deduction of categories in Kant").

In 1884 he taught at the Folk high school in Kronobergs län. In 1899-1901 he taught at Uppsala Högre Allmänna Läroverk after having gained the docent title of theoretical philosophy at Uppsala University. In 1901 he became a Professor of Theoretical Philosophy at Lund University, a position he remained in until he became an emeritus in 1927. Two years before his retirement he was elected a Member of the Swedish Academy.

In 1905 he married Johanna Pålsson. Prof. Larsson is buried on Norra kyrkogården in Lund.

Bibliography 

 Intuition 1892
 Kants transscendentala deduktion af kategorierna 1893
 Lärobok i psykologi på empirisk grund 1896
 Enkla och sammansatta stämningar i dikten 1898
 Studier och meditationer 1899
 Poesiens logik 1899
 Viljans frihet 1899
 Gränsen mellan sensation och emotion 1899
 Sveriges historia i dess sammanhang med Norges och Danmarks jämte notiser ur världshistorien 1903
 Idéer och makter 1908
 Om bildning och självstudier 1908
 Kunskapslivet 1909
 På vandring 1909
 Rousseau och Pestalozzi i våra dagars pedagogiska brytningar 1910
 Reflexioner för dagen 1911
 Intuitionsproblemet 1912
 Evighetsfilosofien i Platons Faidon 1912
 Platon och vår tid 1913
 Logik 1914
 Vänstersynpunkter 1914
 Dagens frågor 1914
 Filosofien och politiken 1915
 Hemmabyarna 1916
 Athena 1917
 Nationalitetsprincipens eventuella tillämpning vid det blivande fredsslutet 1917
 Idéerna i Stabberup 1918
 Under världskrisen 1920
 Den intellektuella åskådningens filosofi 1920
 Den grekiska filosofien 1921
 Skolformer och skolkurser 1922
 Filosofiska uppsatser 1924
 Per Ståstdräng och de andra 1924
 Filosofiens historia i korta drag 1924
 Etisk diskussion 1925
 Litteraturintryck 1926
 Minne av Gottfrid Billing 1926
 Minnesteckning över Christopher Jacob Broström 1930
 Om själen 1930
 Spinoza 1931
 Gemenskap 1932
 Minimum 1935
 Emilia Fogelklou 1935
 Per Axel Samuel Herrlin 1938
 Postscriptum 1944
 Nilsson, Signe: Bidrag till en Bibliografi över Professor Hans Larssons Skrifter. In: Festskrift tillägned Hans Larsson, Stockholm 1927

Awards 

 De Nios stora pris (1920).

References 

Swedish philosophers
Academic staff of Lund University
Members of the Swedish Academy
1862 births
1944 deaths